Harrison Macreadie (born 11 April 1998) is a former professional Australian rules footballer who played for the Carlton Football Club in the Australian Football League (AFL). He made his debut in the forty-three point loss against  in the opening round of the 2017 season at the Melbourne Cricket Ground, where he was a late inclusion for the injured Jed Lamb.

Macreadie held a place on the Carlton list for four seasons. He played eight games in his debut season 2017, but injuries hampered the rest of his time at the club and he played only one more senior game, that match coming in 2019. He was delisted at the end of the 2020 season.

References

External links

1998 births
Living people
Carlton Football Club players
Williamstown Football Club players
Preston Football Club (VFA) players
Australian rules footballers from New South Wales